Angie Milliken is an Australian actress.

Life
Milliken was born and raised in Brisbane, Queensland, Australia. She completed a Bachelor of Arts degree in sociology then turned to acting.

Milliken first became noticed when she starred in the 1991 made-for-TV movie Act of Necessity for which she was nominated for an Australian Film Institute (AFI) Award.

Throughout the 1990s, Milliken starred as Jo Moody in a series of telemovies with Robert Taylor, called The Feds, and in 1999 starred in Paperback Hero, as well as guest starring on Farscape and Stingers.  In 1992 she was in the film Eight Ball and in 1996 she memorably featured in Dead Heart.

She regularly performed on stage for Sydney Theatre Company and became a well known face in the Australian film and television industry. In 2001, she won an AFI award for her role in My Brother Jack and then starred in the acclaimed The Shark Net (2003).

From 2003 to 2005 Milliken starred as Amanda McKay, a lawyer, on MDA, winning an AFI Award in 2003.

Milliken starred in The Condemned in 2007 and has also appeared in an episode of CSI: Miami. Milliken played Jamie Thompson's mother in This Isn't Funny in 2015.

In 2012 Milliken returned to stage acting in Benedict Andrews' Every Breath for Belvoir Street Theatre and The Effect, a joint project of the Sydney Theatre Company and the Queensland Theatre Company.

Nominations and awards
 Act of Necessity, 1991 – nominated for an Australian Film Institute (AFI) Award for Best Actress in a Leading Role
 My Brother Jack, 2001 – won AFI Award for Best Actress in a Telefeature or Mini Series
 MDA, 2003 – won AFI Award for Best Actress in a Leading Role in a Television Drama or Comedy

External links

References

AACTA Award winners
Actresses from Brisbane
Australian film actresses
Australian stage actresses
Australian television actresses
Living people
Year of birth missing (living people)